Aprendi a Llorar is the second album by Mexican iconic pop singer Verónica Castro. Selling more than 700,000 copies, it was released in 1979.
Verónica Castro starred in the "Telenovela" Los Ricos También Lloran.

Track listing
 "Aprendí a Llorar" (Loloita de la Colina)
 "Como un Cuento de Hadas" 
 "Corazoncito" 
 "Lo Conocí en Torreon" 
 "San Francisco de Asis" (Lalo Rodríguez)
 "Yo creo en el Mañana" 
 "Necesito tu Amor"

Singles

Album

1979 albums
Verónica Castro albums